Who, whom? (kto kogo?) is a Bolshevist principle or slogan which was formulated by Lenin in 1921.

Lenin is supposed to have stated at the second All-Russian Congress of Political Education Departments, on 17 October 1921, 

"The whole question is—who will overtake whom?"

Leon Trotsky used the shortened "who whom" formulation in his 1925 article, "Towards Capitalism or Towards Socialism?"

The shortened form  was invoked by Joseph Stalin in 1929, in a speech to the Central Committee of the Communist Party of the Soviet Union, which also gave the formula its "aura of hard-line coercion" (while Lenin's phrase indicated a willingness to embrace economic competition):
"The fact is, we live according to Lenin's formula: Kto–kogo?: will we knock them, the capitalists, flat and give them (as Lenin expresses it) the final, decisive battle, or will they knock us flat?"

It came to be used as a formula describing the inevitability of class struggle, i.e. who (which of two antagonists) will dominate the other.
In this view, all compromises and promises between enemies are just expedients – tactical manoeuvres in the struggle for mastery.

See also 
 Cui bono
 Charles de Gaulle, who said "France has no friends, only interests."

References

Political catchphrases